Eugene Buren Sherman (December 25, 1871 – August 17, 1956) served two  terms as mayor of Boise, Idaho, from 1921 to 1925.

References

Sources
Mayors of Boise - Past and Present
Idaho State Historical Society Reference Series, Corrected List of Mayors, 1867-1996

External links
 

Mayors of Boise, Idaho
1871 births
1963 deaths